Pilgrims F.C. was an English association football club based in Clapton, London. During their history they played at various grounds in Tottenham and Walthamstow, but for the most part played home games at Hackney Downs.

History

The club was founded in 1871 under the name Clapton Pilgrims, changing its name to Pilgrims in 1873.  The club restricted playing membership to 60 players.

The club's first match was a 0-0 draw with Leyton on Hackney Downs.  The club is known to have played five matches in its first season (against Forest F.C., Trojans, the return against Leyton, and Herts Rangers), and every one ended in a draw.  After the Forest match, the Pilgrims raised the issue of clubs borrowing players from other clubs, as Pilgrims restricted its choices solely to its members.

In 1874, Pilgrims player John van Sommer was chosen as a reserve for England for the international match against Scotland.  On 7 November 1874 van Sommer played in goal for the London select team in the match against the Sheffield Football Association.  It was van Sommer's final match as soon after he caught rheumatic fever and died on 19 November 1874.  The Sportsman's obituary stated that "the writer saw him at Sheffield displaying on behalf of London certainly the best goal‐keeping that has ever been witnessed at the Association game.  Indeed,his skill on that occasion led those present to predict for him a place in the International match of the year."

The club entered the FA Cup every year from 1873-74 to 1884-85, its best outing being reaching the third round (last ten) in 1876-77, for which season the club had moved to Tottenham.  In the third round the club was drawn away to eventual winners Wanderers F.C. and lost 3-0.

The club seems to have stopped playing matches after the 1886-87 season.  The club's final secretary John Henderson undertook refereeing and umpiring activities as a member of the Pilgrims club in 1886-87, but for 1887-88 was described as being from "Morpeth Harriers, formerly Pilgrims".

Records
Best FA Cup performance: 3rd Round – 1876–77 & 1879–80

Colours

The club's original colours were black & white “in broad bars”, black skullcap with white tassel, white knickerbockers, and black stockings.  It dropped the cap in 1878 and in 1879 changed the shirts to black and white halves.

Grounds

The club originally played at Hackney Downs.  In 1876, the club moved to Lordship Lane, Tottenham., and in 1881 the club moved to Walthamstow.

Ramblers F.C.

In 1874, a separate club, Ramblers F.C., was set up, often using Pilgrims players, and the two clubs were described as "sister clubs".  The two clubs were drawn against each other in the FA Cup twice (Pilgrims winning on both occasions) and Ramblers' players often played for both sides in the same season.

Notable players
Clopton Lloyd-Jones
Harry Swepstone
Andrew Watson

References

Defunct football clubs in England